Richard Dean was an American athlete, model and photographer.

Richard Dean may also refer to:
 Richard D. Dean, United States Army general
 Richard Dean (civil servant) (1772−1850), British civil servant
 Richard Dean (curate), Anglican minister and animal rights writer

See also
 Dick Dean, American automobile designer and builder of custom cars
 Richard Deane (disambiguation)
 Richard Dean Anderson, American actor and producer